Arzgir is a rural locality (a selo) and the administrative center of Arzgirsky District of Stavropol Krai, Russia. Population:

References

Notes

Sources

Rural localities in Stavropol Krai